Ces53 is the graffiti name of Tonny van Hoenderloo van Zandt, street art/graffiti artist from the Netherlands. Ces53 has been active since 1985 and is the creator of many international street art/graffiti paintings, predominantly in European cities but also worldwide in Mexico, United States and Burma.

Work
Ces53 started as a traditional graffiti writer, one of the first to paint graffiti on trains in the Netherlands, Belgium and Germany. He became world-famous because of his high-quality graffiti paintings, also adopted more traditional art forms during the years, including painting and sculpturing. He became renowned for his innovative styles, quantity of work, and gained a lot of fame and followers within the graffiti community. Since 2005 Ces53 is also part of Lastplak, a world-famous Dutch street art collective.

References 

  Graffiti in Rotterdam , Stichting Kunstpublicaties Rotterdam, 2005,  
  Wholecars , Aragon,1996,  ♦
 Graffiti Art #10, Scwarzkopf & Scwarzkopf,1999,

External links 
 graffiti.org
 Ces53 website

Year of birth missing (living people)
Living people
Dutch graffiti artists
Pseudonymous artists
Artists from Rotterdam